Samuel "Sam" Edney (born June 29, 1984) is a retired Canadian luger who has competed since 2000. Competing in four Winter Olympics.

Career

Early start and Olympic debut 
Edney got into the sport at the age of 14 and began competing at the 2000 Canadian Junior Championship in Calgary.  In 2004, Edney would return to Calgary to win second place in doubles at the Junior World Cup Champs.

In 2006, he made his Olympic debut in Turin, finishing nineteenth overall. At the Vancouver Winter Olympics, Edney placed seventh.

In 2012, Edney was part of the Canadian team that won Bronze at the World Championships.  A year later, he would have his best placement, earning Silver at the 2013 World Championships.

2014 Sochi Olympics 
In 2014, Edney was part of the team that placed fourth in the team relay at the Sochi Winter Olympics.  In late 2017, the Russian team that placed seconded was stripped of its medals due to the doping scandal.  This temporarily promoted the Canadian team's finish to Bronze.  In early 2018, the IOC's decision to strip the Russians of their medals was overturned, thus placing the Canadian team back in fourth place.

Later in 2014, Edney would place first male singles at the World Cup, securing Canada's first World Cup win.  In 2015, he would win another Bronze at the World Championships.

2018 Pyeongchang Olympics 
In Pyeongchang, Sam contended for a medal, but ended up sixth, the best ever Men's Singles Olympic showing for Canada.  He was less than a tenth of a second outside of a medal, a few days later however, he along with teammates Alex Gough, Tristan Walker, and Justin Snith took home silver in the Team relay.

References

2006 luge men's singles results
Canoe.ca profile
CBC.ca profile
Luge Canada profile

External links

1984 births
Living people
Canadian male lugers
Olympic lugers of Canada
Lugers at the 2006 Winter Olympics
Lugers at the 2010 Winter Olympics
Lugers at the 2014 Winter Olympics
Lugers at the 2018 Winter Olympics
Lugers from Calgary
Medalists at the 2018 Winter Olympics
Olympic silver medalists for Canada
Olympic medalists in luge